Metroblogging  was an online local media project founded by Jason DeFillippo and Sean Bonner, subsequently owned by Sean Bonner, Jason DeFillippo and Richard Ault, collectively Bode Media, Inc. Started in Los Angeles in November 2003, the project included 57 city-specific blogs around the world, with close to 700 contributors. Contributors have included  Xeni Jardin and Wil Wheaton (Los Angeles), Violet Blue (San Francisco), Johannes Grenzfurthner (Vienna), and Joi Ito (Tokyo).

History
The first post on blogging.la was on November 30, 2003.  When it started, it was intended as a group blog where a number of bloggers from Los Angeles could talk about the city as they saw it. Following the success of blogging.la, Bonner and DeFillippo considered expanding to Orange County, California, but in the end started an international network, which would be known as Metroblogging.

Bonner and DeFillippo enlisted a team of bloggers for each of the four initial Metroblogging sites (San Francisco, New York City, London and Chicago).  Over the next year, Metroblogging added another thirty city sites to its network.  As weblogs started to become an increasingly popular source of first person accounts for news events circa 2005, Metroblogging provided such content.

July 2005 London bombings
During both bombings upon the London mass-transit system. Metroblogging London became a hub for sharing news and first person accounts of the bombings.

Hurricane Katrina
When Hurricane Katrina struck the Gulf Coast of the United States in August 2005 Metroblogging New Orleans provided first hand accounts of the destruction.

The writers for Metroblogging New Orleans reported on the anarchy days before any of the major news outlets did. They reportED on the dire needs and the terrible conditions and questioned the lack of reaction by city, state, and federal officials before others were aware of the extent of the crisis.

They corrected the mainstream media in some of its reporting.

Kashmir earthquake
The members of Metroblogging Karachi and Metroblogging Lahore contributed to the relief efforts by extensively networking with NGOs and other working groups following the 2005 Kashmir earthquake.

Dawson College Shooting
The Dawson College Shooting affected the entire city and many people wrote about it. But one of their writers, who happens to work for Dawson College, wrote about his experience of what happened on September 13, 2006.

References

External links

Blogs